Maybe I'll Catch Fire is the second album by American punk rock band Alkaline Trio, released on March 14, 2000 through Asian Man Records. It was their final studio album for Asian Man and their last with drummer Glenn Porter. Porter was replaced by former Smoking Popes member Mike Felumlee after recording had finished, making his stage debut in December 1999. The band promoted the album with an appearance on the 2000 Plea for Peace Tour in June and July of that year.

Reception 

By August 2008, the album sold 85,000 copies.

Mike DaRonco of Allmusic liked the album, but less than the band's previous effort, 1998's Goddamnit, saying that "Lyrically, Maybe I'll Catch Fire follows in the footsteps of Goddamnit, while staying true to the elaborate but emotional tone of aggressive pop-punk. Not as essential as the Trio's previous efforts, but it would be difficult for any band to follow up an album like Goddamnit".

Track listing

Personnel 
Alkaline Trio
Matt Skiba – guitar, vocals
Dan Andriano – bass, vocals
Glenn Porter – drums

Artwork
Craig Ackerman – Layout Design
Brian Case – Layout Design
Heather Han – Photography

Production
Matt Allison – Producer, engineer
John Golden – Mastering

References

External links

Maybe I'll Catch Fire at YouTube (streamed copy where licensed)

Alkaline Trio albums
2000 albums
Asian Man Records albums
Albums produced by Matt Allison (record producer)